The Kew Letters (also known as the Circular Note of Kew) were a number of letters, written by stadtholder William V, Prince of Orange between 30 January and 8 February 1795 from the "Dutch House" at Kew Palace, where he temporarily stayed after his trip to England on 18 January 1795. The letters were written in his capacity of Captain-general of the Dutch Republic to the civil and military authorities in the provinces of Zeeland and Friesland (that had not yet capitulated at the time), to the officers commanding Dutch naval vessels in British harbours and to Dutch colonial governors. It urged them to continue resistance in cooperation with Great Britain against the armed forces of the French Republic that had invaded the Dutch Republic and forced him to flee to England. In particular the letters to the colonial governors played an important role, because they ordered them to surrender those colonies to the British.

The governors of Malacca, Amboina, and West Sumatra complied without a fight. Cochin surrendered after a brief bombardment. The rest of the Dutch enclaves in southern India and seaside Sri Lanka were quickly taken as well. Elsewhere, though the governors did not comply with the order to put their military installations at British disposal, many were confused and demoralised by the letters.

In the 1801 Oranienstein Letters, William V and his son did recognise the Batavian Republic, and renounced their hereditary stadtholderate.

References
 (1995), The Dutch Republic: Its Rise, Greatness and Fall, 1477-1806, Oxford University Press,  hardback,  paperback, p. 1127
  (2005) Inventaris van de archieven van stadhouder Willem V (1745-1808) en de Hofcommissie van Willem IV en Willem V (1732-1794), Uitgeverij Verloren, p. 102 (No. 1007)
 (2001) The Oxford History of the British Empire: Volume III: The Nineteenth Century, Oxford University Press,  Paperback, p. 374

Patriottentijd
Netherlands–United Kingdom relations
History of Great Britain
Dutch East India Company
1795 in the Batavian Republic
History of the London Borough of Richmond upon Thames
Kew, London
1795 documents